Mirim Airport, also known as Pyongyang East Airfield or K-24 Air Base, is an airport in Mirim-dong, Sadong-guyok, Pyongyang-si, North Korea.

Facilities 
The airfield has a single concrete runway 09/27 measuring 4310 x 69 feet (1314 x 21 m).  It is sited along the Taedong River on the eastern edge of the capital city of Pyongyang.  It has several taxiways, but the former airbase facilities are no longer used for air traffic. The site has since become a staging ground for large capital parades.

North of the former airport is a  runway with two helipads and a single structure.

Mirim Air Club operates ultralight aircraft from the airfield for tours around the city, which began in 2016.

Rehearsals for all military parades usually take place 3–6 weeks prior to the actual parade at the Mirim Parade Training Facility, located on the eastern side of the base.

History

Korean War
Following the capture of Pyongyang on 19 October 1950 the air base was put into service by the UN forces. The USAF designated the base K-24.

USAF units stationed at the base included:
 18th Fighter-Bomber Wing operating F-51s from 22 November–5 December 1950
 Detachment F, 3rd Air Rescue Squadron
 6002nd Tactical Support Wing

UN units stationed at the base included:
 2 Squadron SAAF operating F-51s

UN forces abandoned the base on 5 December 1950 as part of the evacuation of Pyongyang during the UN retreat from North Korea. On 10 December 1950 B-29s bombed the airfield with high-explosive bombs.

Post-war
In May 1952, the 272nd Construction Unit of the North Korean Air Force under the direction of Soviet advisors were ordered to lengthen the runway.

See also
Pyongyang Air Base
Pyongyang Sunan International Airport

References 

1940s establishments in Korea
Buildings and structures in Pyongyang
Airports in North Korea
Transport in Pyongyang
Tourism in Pyongyang
Korean War air bases